The Baysh Dam is a gravity dam on Wadi Baysh about  northeast of Baysh in the Jizan Region of southwestern Saudi Arabia. The dam has many purposes to include flood control, irrigation and groundwater recharge. The dam was constructed between 2003 and 2009. At  in height, it is the tallest dam in Saudi Arabia. It was constructed by Yüksel İnşaat A.Ş. and is owned and operated by the Ministry of Water and Electricity.

References

Dams completed in 2009
Dams in Saudi Arabia
Jizan Province
Gravity dams
2009 establishments in Saudi Arabia